Joshua Foster Ober (1839-1896), usually known as J. Foster Ober, was an American architect. His work included the design of the Odd Fellows' Hall in Beverly, Massachusetts and an 1881 expansion to the Hotel Vendome in Boston. He died on August 12, 1896.

Life and career
Joshua Foster Ober was born September 1, 1839 in Beverly, Massachusetts. His mother was Hephzibah P. Ober and his father Samuel Ober. He attended Brown University in Providence, graduating in 1864. Moving to Boston, he entered the firm of Snell & Gregerson as a student. He remained there until 1867, when he traveled in Europe. Upon his return to Boston, he was employed by the firm of Bryant & Rogers, and established his own practice in 1872. Outside of a partnership with George D. Rand from 1877 to 1881, Ober practiced alone until his death, which occurred August 12, 1896 at his home in West Newton.

Personal life
He was married to Lucie E. Doten in 1880.

Works
Parish of the Messiah church building Foster Ober was commissioned to draw up plans of a church building located to the North and West of the Chapel (built in 1881)
Kindergarten drawing for D. N. Skillings, Esq. at Rangely Place, Winchester, Massachusetts by J. F. Ober & G. D. Rand  
Odd Fellows' Hall (Beverly, Massachusetts) at 188-194 Cabot St. in Beverly, Massachusetts, a gothic building listed on the National Register of Historic Places. First constructed about 1850 with involved architects including J. Foster Ober, Williams Brothers, and others.
Architectural rendering of house for S. J. Nowell at Winchester, Massachusetts, J. F. Ober and G. D. Rand
Bennett School building
Congregational Church, West Newton: remodel with new chapel and parlors

References

Further reading
Entry in Henry F. Withey, A.I.A., and Elsie Rathburn Withey, Biographical Dictionary of American Architects  Los Angeles, New Age Publishing Company, 1956. Facsimile edition, Hennessey & Ingalls, Inc., 1970

Architects from Massachusetts
Architects from Boston
People from Beverly, Massachusetts
Brown University alumni
1839 births
1896 deaths